Group 5 may refer to:
Group 5 element, chemical element classification
Group 5 (racing), FIA classification for cars in auto racing

See also
 G5 (disambiguation)